Phillip King (born December 19, 1981 in Taipei, Taiwan) is a former professional tennis player from the United States. In later years he also played tennis in Hong Kong.

Personal life 
King's parents David and Karen King emigrated to the U.S. from Taiwan in 1982. King is the oldest of four children. Two of his younger sisters are tennis players; the youngest one Vania King was the 2010 Wimbledon ladies doubles champion and 2010 US Open tennis doubles champion.

Tennis career 
King started playing tennis when he was a boy. He was coached by his father David King who was a professional tennis player in Taiwan with several national championships, being known for his powerful forehand compared to his Taiwanese peers.  David King was later credited with teaching his son his winning forehand shot. Phillip King won the USTA Junior National Championships in 1999 and 2000. He was two-time All-American in 2000-01 and 2001-02 while he attended Duke University, North Carolina.

On May 9, 2004 he turned professional, and was coached by Eliot Teltscher who also coached Pete Sampras. King has played in US Open, ATP World Tour and other major tournaments.

In later years after a break in professional tennis, King joined Hong Kong Davis Cup team 2013–15, being the captain in 2015. He was also the non-playing captain for Hong Kong team in Fed Cup 2014 and 2015.

Coaching career 
King was appointed head coach for Hong Kong tennis team competing in 2013 East Asian Games hosted by Tianjin, China.

References

External links

Interview Phillip King

American male tennis players
Duke Blue Devils men's tennis players
Taiwanese emigrants to the United States
Tennis players from Long Beach, California
1981 births
Living people
Hong Kong male tennis players
Sportspeople from Taipei